Stephen Beatty (born 1 September 1969 in Carrickfergus) is a former professional  Northern Irish football midfielder who began his career playing for Carrick Rangers in Northern Ireland. In June 1988 he signed with English second level side Chelsea, that won promotion from the English Second Division that season, but Stephen Beatty failed to make an impact in the first team. With no chance of playing top-flight level with Chelsea the following season, he then signed with Danish top-flight side AGF Aarhus, but only got to play a few league games in 1990 before moving back to Northern Ireland, where he became Irish League Champion four times, playing for Linfield. He has been capped twice for the Northern Ireland under-21 national team. Stephen has recently been a coach for Irish League side Newry City FC. Stephen originates from Rathcoole, Newtownabbey, Co. Antrim.

Honours
Irish Football League: 4
Linfield 1992/93, 1993/94, 1999/00, 2000/01

Irish Cup: 3 
Linfield 1993/94, 1994/95
Coleraine 2002/03

References

External links
Stephen Beatty player profile

1969 births
Living people
Association footballers from Northern Ireland
Association football midfielders
Northern Ireland under-21 international footballers
Expatriate men's footballers in Denmark
Chelsea F.C. players
Aarhus Gymnastikforening players
Linfield F.C. players
Coleraine F.C. players
Carrick Rangers F.C. players
Expatriate sportspeople from Northern Ireland